Brian Lambert (born 10 October 1930) is a former  Australian rules footballer who played with Hawthorn in the Victorian Football League (VFL).

Notes

External links 

Living people
1930 births
Australian rules footballers from Victoria (Australia)
Hawthorn Football Club players
Dandenong Football Club players